30 Years Live is the 2nd live album from the band Bad Religion, which was released on May 18, 2010, therein documenting the band's 30th anniversary tour. It is the band's first live album in 13 years, since Tested in 1997. Rather than a standard release, it was available for free download to members of Bad Religion's official mailing list.

The Bad Religion albums that do not have songs represented in this album are the Bad Religion EP, Into the Unknown, Back to the Known, No Control, No Substance, The New America and The Process of Belief, even though songs from some of those albums were performed live on the 30th anniversary tour.

Background
On March 4, 2010, it was announced on the band's website that they would be recording a new live album during their spring tour of 2010. The official quote from the website reads:

"To celebrate three decades of Bad Religion, we'll be recording a live album during our spring 2010 tour, and offering it as a free "thank you" to the loyal fans who've been with us through all the sweat and mayhem. So let us know who you are by joining our mailing list below, and sometime late spring we'll let you know how you can get your free Bad Religion 30 Years Live download. We'll be playing a few tracks at the shows from our new album, coming this fall, so this will be a great way to get a preview of the new tunes. Thanks again to the greatest and best-looking fans a band could hope for."

The song "Won't Somebody" was previously released as an acoustic bonus track on the New Maps of Hell Deluxe Edition. An electric version was later featured on their 2010 studio album, The Dissent of Man. A studio version of "Resist-Stance" also later appeared on The Dissent of Man.

To commemorate their 30 years as a band, Bad Religion planned a 30 song set each night. According to Graffin, this went against their long held belief that "punk shows shouldn't be longer than an hour". This 30 song set included standard openings and encores with various songs played between. The same set was never played twice. Despite playing 30 songs live in all but one concert, the album includes only 17 tracks.

Release
The live album has not been sold in stores. Instead, it was released as a free download for fans who had signed up on the mailing list at the band's website.

On March 8, 2010, it was announced on the Epitaph Blog that the album would be released on May 18, 2010 for a short period only.

In 2016 the album was released on vinyl

Tour dates
Anaheim, California – House of Blues – March 17, 2010
Anaheim, California – House of Blues – March 18, 2010
San Diego, California – House of Blues – March 19, 2010
San Diego, California – House of Blues – March 20, 2010
San Diego, California – House of Blues – March 21, 2010
Los Angeles, California – House of Blues – March 24, 2010
Los Angeles, California – House of Blues – March 25, 2010
Las Vegas, Nevada – House of Blues – March 26, 2010
Las Vegas, Nevada – House of Blues – March 27, 2010
Anaheim, California – House of Blues – March 31, 2010
Anaheim, California – House of Blues – April 1, 2010
Anaheim, California – House of Blues – April 2, 2010
Los Angeles, California – House of Blues – April 3, 2010
Los Angeles, California – House of Blues – April 4, 2010
Anaheim, California – House of Blues – April 8, 2010
Anaheim, California – House of Blues – April 9, 2010
Los Angeles, California – House of Blues – April 10, 2010
Anaheim, California – House of Blues – April 15, 2010
Los Angeles, California – House of Blues – April 16, 2010
Los Angeles, California – House of Blues – April 17, 2010

Track listing

Band members
 Greg Graffin – vocals
 Brett Gurewitz – guitar, backing vocals
 Brian Baker – guitar, backing vocals
 Greg Hetson – guitar
 Jay Bentley – bass, backing vocals
 Brooks Wackerman – drums

References

Bad Religion live albums
2010 live albums
Albums free for download by copyright owner
Epitaph Records live albums